The 2017 Hungaroring FIA Formula 2 round was a pair of motor races held on 29 and 30 July 2017 at the Hungaroring in Mogyoród, Hungary as part of the FIA Formula 2 Championship. It was the seventh round of the 2017 FIA Formula 2 Championship and was run in support of the 2017 Hungarian Grand Prix.

The championship leader Charles Leclerc was due to make history in Formula 2 with his seventh consecutive pole - the first driver in the series history ever to set the benchmark. He later got disqualified due to a technical breach and was forced to start from the back of the grid. Thus, Oliver Rowland inherited pole position, which became his first and only pole position of the season.

Classifications

Qualifying

Feature Race

Sprint Race

Championship standings after the round

Drivers' Championship standings

Teams' Championship standings

 Note: Only the top five positions are included for both sets of standings.

References

External links 
 

Budapest
Budapest Formula 2
Budapest Formula 2